Domen Škofic (born April 11, 1994 in Ljubljana) is a Slovenian sport climber and rock climber. In 2016, he won the IFSC Climbing World Cup in Lead climbing.

Rankings

Climbing World Cup

Climbing World Championships 
Youth

Adult

Climbing European Championships 
Youth

Adult

Rock Master

Number of medals in the Climbing European Youth Cup

Lead

Number of medals in the Climbing World Cup

Lead

References

External links 

 Adidas-rockstars profile

Slovenian rock climbers
Living people
1994 births
Sportspeople from Ljubljana
Competitors at the 2013 World Games
Competitors at the 2017 World Games
IFSC Climbing World Cup overall medalists